András Bodnár (born April 9, 1942) is a former Hungarian water polo player and freestyle swimmer who competed in the 1960 Summer Olympics,  1964 Summer Olympics, 1968 Summer Olympics and 1972 Summer Olympics. He is one of eight male athletes who won four or more Olympic medals in water polo.

Bodnár was born in Ungvár, Kingdom of Hungary. He was part of the Hungarian water polo team which won the bronze medal in the 1960 tournament. He played one match and scored one goal. He also participated in the 1500 metre freestyle competition but was eliminated in the first round.

Four years later he was a member of the Hungarian team which won the gold medal in the 1964 Olympic tournament. He played five matches and scored two goals. In the 400 metre freestyle event he was eliminated in the first round.

At the 1968 Games he won his second bronze medal with the Hungarian team. He played all eight matches and scored two goals.

His last Olympic tournament was in Munich 1972 where he won a silver medal. He played all eight matches and scored seven goals for the Hungarian team.

See also
 Hungary men's Olympic water polo team records and statistics
 List of multiple Olympic medalists in one event
 List of Olympic champions in men's water polo
 List of Olympic medalists in water polo (men)
 List of players who have appeared in multiple men's Olympic water polo tournaments
 List of world champions in men's water polo
 List of World Aquatics Championships medalists in water polo
 List of members of the International Swimming Hall of Fame

References

External links 
 

1942 births
Living people
Hungarian male water polo players
Hungarian male swimmers
Hungarian male freestyle swimmers
Olympic water polo players of Hungary
Olympic swimmers of Hungary
Water polo players at the 1960 Summer Olympics
Water polo players at the 1964 Summer Olympics
Water polo players at the 1968 Summer Olympics
Water polo players at the 1972 Summer Olympics
Swimmers at the 1960 Summer Olympics
Swimmers at the 1964 Summer Olympics
Olympic gold medalists for Hungary
Olympic silver medalists for Hungary
Olympic bronze medalists for Hungary
Olympic medalists in water polo
Medalists at the 1972 Summer Olympics
Medalists at the 1968 Summer Olympics
Medalists at the 1964 Summer Olympics
Medalists at the 1960 Summer Olympics
World Aquatics Championships medalists in water polo
20th-century Hungarian people
21st-century Hungarian people